Anthony Lionel Blackman   (born April 1928) is a British aviator, and former Chief Test Pilot for Avro.

Early life
Blackman was the son of the radiologist Dr Sydney Blackman (7 December 1898 - 1971) of Kensington Court, one of the principal developers of panoramic radiography in dentistry, and the son of Polish emigrants, educated at the Grocers' Company School (later known as Hackney Downs School). His father, when a local GP, was at the birth of the playwright Harold Pinter. His parents Sydney and Lena Goodman had married in 1923 in Hackney. His sister Rita Mason (1925- 25 March 2008) was also a dental radiologist (oral and maxillofacial radiology), with her father at the Royal Dental Hospital, attending Henrietta Barnett School in Hampstead Garden Suburb. His father helped to found the British Society of Dental and Maxillo-facial Radiology.

Blackman attended Oundle School. When at Oundle he saw many damaged US bombers returning to RAF Polebrook and RAF Deenethorpe in Northamptonshire. Later he studied Physics at Trinity College, Cambridge.

Career

Royal Air Force
From October 1948 Blackman started his National Service at RAF Padgate near Warrington. He joined the RAF, in December 1948 as a Pilot Officer, training for 12 weeks at RAF Wellesbourne at the RAF School of Education becoming a Maths and Physics instructor at No. 1 Initial Training School at RAF Wittering, then learned to fly from January 1950 at RAF Ternhill with 6 FTS (No. 6 Flying Training School RAF) on the Percival Prentice, on the No. 38 Pilots Course.

He joined the Empire Test Pilots' School (ETPS). He flew Vampires and Venoms with 5 and 11 squadrons. He worked at the Aeroplane and Armament Experimental Establishment (A&AEE), with B Squadron, until August 1956.

Avro

Blackman joined Avro as a test pilot, becoming Chief Test Pilot, and flying with Avro from 1956 to 1973. He tested 105 of the Vulcans that were built. Avro won a contract to build the Mach 3 Avro 730, and he was to be the test pilot; the project was cancelled in 1957. He was offered to become a Concorde test pilot. He did fly Concorde (G-AXDN, now at Duxford) once, taking the place of Jock Cochrane at RAF Fairford. He was the test pilot for the Hawker Siddeley HS 748 (Avro 748) and the Hawker Siddeley Nimrod (designed by Gilbert Whitehead).

Smiths Industries
Blackman later worked for Smiths Industries.

Personal life
Blackman married Margaret in late 1956. He had a son in 1964 (who married in 1998, with a grand-daughter in 2003) and a daughter in 1961.

When with Avro, he lived in Hamble-le-Rice. He was made an OBE in the 1974 Birthday Honours. When deputy chief test pilot of Hawker Siddeley in Cheshire, he was awarded the Queen's Commendation for Valuable Service in the Air in the 1970 New Year Honours.

See also
 Avro Heritage Museum
 John Allam (1924-2019) of Handley Page, deputy test pilot of the Handley Page Victor, chief test pilot of HP from 1965, who first flew the Handley Page Jetstream in August 1967

References

External links
 Biography
 XM603 at Woodford

1928 births
Living people
Alumni of Trinity College, Cambridge
Avro Vulcan
English test pilots
English people of Polish descent
Fellows of the Royal Aeronautical Society
Hawker Siddeley
Officers of the Order of the British Empire
People educated at Oundle School
People from Kensington
People from Hamble-le-Rice
Recipients of the Commendation for Valuable Service in the Air
Royal Air Force officers